Moriarity: The Devil's Game is a mystery drama podcast written by creator and executive producer Charles Kindinger. The 10-episode series was released July 7, 2022, and was produced by Treefort Media and Audible.

Plot 
Moriarty: The Devils Game offers a different take on the familiar story of Sherlock Holmes, asking "What if Holmes' most villainous nemes is was actually an innocent man?" The podcast recasts Professor James Moriarty as a desperate fugitive framed for murder.

Cast 

 Dominic Monaghan as Professor Moriarity
 Billy Boyd as Colonel Sebastian Moran
 Phil LaMarr as Sherlock Holmes
 Lindsay Whisler as Rose Winslow
 Adam Godley as Doctor Watson
 Curtis Armstrong as Chief Inspector Gregson
 Josh Robert Thompson as Inspector Lestrade
 Carlo Rota as John Clay
 Victoria Smurfit as Madame Charlotte
 Billy Harris as JJ Moriarity
 Rebecca Mader as Mary Watson
 Aaron Lyons as Bellman
 Lindsay Jean Michelle as additional voices

References

External links 

 
 
 Treefort Media Podcast Page

2020 audio plays
Historical fiction podcasts
2022 podcast debuts
Works based on Sherlock Holmes